Hopeful may refer to

 "Hopeful" (Ami Suzuki song)
 "Hopeful" (Bars and Melody song)
 Hopeful, Alabama
 Hopeful, Georgia
 Mount Hopeful, peak in the Shetland Islands

See also
 Hope
 The Hopefuls